Negara may refer to:
 Negara, Bali, a city in Indonesia
 Negara: The Theatre State in Nineteenth-Century Bali, a book by anthropologist Clifford Geertz.
 Negara Brunei Darussalam, a sovereign state located on the north coast of the island of Borneo.
 Negara Islam Indonesia, an Islamist group in Indonesia that aims for the establishment of an Islamic state of Indonesia.
 Negara Daha, a Hindu kingdom now located in the Regency of Hulu Sungai Selatan, Province of South Kalimantan, Republic of Indonesia.
 Negara River, a river of Borneo, Indonesia.